Litania – The Music of Krzysztof Komeda is an album by the Polish jazz trumpeter and composer Tomasz Stańko featuring compositions by Krzysztof Komeda, recorded in 1997 and released on the ECM label.

Reception
The AllMusic review by Scott Yanow stated: "Depending on one's musical tastes, the results are either dull or intriguing, but definitely picturesque and cinematic".

Track listing
All compositions by Krzysztof Komeda
 "Svantetic" - 11:01   
 "Sleep Safe and Warm (Version 1)" - 3:07   
 "Night-Time, Daytime Requiem" - 21:47   
 "Ballada" - 4:17   
 "Litania" - 6:52   
 "Sleep Safe and Warm (Version 2)" - 2:42   
 "Repetition" - 3:54   
 "Ballad for Bernt" - 3:43   
 "The Witch" - 5:28   
 "Sleep Safe and Warm (Version 3)" - 2:06

Personnel
Tomasz Stańko - trumpet
Bernt Rosengren - tenor saxophone
Joakim Milder - tenor saxophone, soprano saxophone
Terje Rypdal - electric guitar
Bobo Stenson - piano
Palle Danielsson - bass
Jon Christensen - drums

References

ECM Records albums
Tomasz Stańko albums
1997 albums
Albums produced by Manfred Eicher